The superficial external pudendal artery (superficial external pudic artery) is one of the three pudendal arteries. It arises from the medial side of the femoral artery, close to the superficial epigastric artery and superficial iliac circumflex artery.

Course and target
After piercing the femoral sheath and fascia cribrosa, it courses medialward, across the spermatic cord (or round ligament in the female), to be distributed to the integument on the lower part of the abdomen, the penis and scrotum in the male, and the labium majus in the female, anastomosing with branches of the internal pudendal artery.
It crosses superficial to the inguinal ligament.

See also
 Deep external pudendal artery
 Internal pudendal artery

Additional images

References

External links
 

Arteries of the lower limb